Gundlabavi is a village in Yadadri Bhuvanagiri district in Telangana, India. It falls under Choutuppal mandal.

References

Villages in Yadadri Bhuvanagiri district